Mount Currie is a  mountain summit located in the upper Spray River Valley of southern Banff National Park, in the Canadian Rockies of Alberta, Canada.  Mount Currie's nearest higher peak is Red Man Mountain,  to the southwest on the Continental Divide.

History

Mount Currie was named in 1918 for General Sir Arthur William Currie (1875-1933), the first Canadian commander of the Canadian Corps and later the Canadian Army during World War I.

The mountain's name was made official in 1924 by the Geographical Names Board of Canada.

Geology

Mount Currie is composed of sedimentary rock laid down during the Precambrian to Jurassic periods and was later pushed east and over the top of younger rock during the Laramide orogeny. The southeast face of the mountain displays chevron folds in the calcareous shale.

Climate

Based on the Köppen climate classification, Mount Currie is located in a subarctic climate with cold, snowy winters, and mild summers. Precipitation runoff from the mountain drains into Currie Creek and White Man Creek, which are both tributaries of Spray River.

See also
 Geography of Alberta

References

External links
 National Park Service web site: Banff National Park

Currie
Alberta's Rockies